Charles Osgood Wood III (born January 8, 1933), known professionally as Charles Osgood, is an American radio and television commentator, writer and musician. Osgood is best known for being the host of CBS News Sunday Morning, a role he held for over 22 years from April 10, 1994, until September 25, 2016. Osgood also hosted The Osgood File, a series of daily radio commentaries, from 1971 until December 29, 2017.

He is also known for being the voice of the narrator of Horton Hears a Who!, an animated film released in 2008, based on the book of the same name by Dr. Seuss. He published a memoir of his boyhood in 2004.

Childhood and education
Osgood was born in the Bronx, New York City in 1933. As a child, he moved with his family to the Liberty Heights neighborhood of Baltimore, Maryland. He attended St. Cecilia High School in Englewood, New Jersey.

His memoir about growing up in Baltimore during World War II is called Defending Baltimore Against Enemy Attack (2004) and he recounts his perspective from age nine.

Osgood graduated from Fordham University in 1954 with a Bachelor of Science degree in economics.

Early career
For the first dozen years of his career, except as noted below Osgood used his legal name professionally either as "Charles Wood" or as "Charles O. Wood."

WFUV Radio
While attending Fordham, Osgood volunteered at the university's FM campus radio station, WFUV. He often played piano between records on his shows and frequently collaborated with other students including future actor Alan Alda and future producer and director Jack Haley, Jr.

United States Army Band
Immediately after graduating from Fordham, Osgood was hired as an announcer by WGMS (AM) and WGMS-FM, the classical music stations in Washington, D.C. (today WWRC and WTOP-FM respectively).  Shortly afterward, however, he enlisted in the military to be the announcer for the United States Army Band.  In 1991, he explained this turn of events in an interview with the Los Angeles Times.

[After college graduation] I went right to work for a classical musical [sic] station in Washington called WGMS. I was an announcer. I learned a lot doing that.

I was about to be drafted in the Army, this was 1954, and I ran into a guy while I was having dinner with a friend of mine and he was dressed in a white uniform, the most fancy uniform this side of the Ritz Hotel. It turned out he was the announcer for the United States Army Band. I asked him when he was getting out and he said within the next few weeks, so the next morning I was parked out at the commanding officer's office. He was impressed with the fact I could pronounce Rimsky-Korsakov. That's how I got the job. I spent three years with the United States Army Band. It was a great experience.

Besides acting as the band's master of ceremonies, he performed as a pianist with the band and sang with the United States Army Chorus.

His roommate was  John Cacavas who composed arrangements for the band.   They would collaborate on many songs, a relationship that would continue through the 1960s.  In 1967, along with U.S. Senator Everett Dirksen (R-Illinois) together they won a Grammy Award for best spoken word performance for their single Gallant Men.  As Dirksen read a patriotic poem written by H. Paul Jeffers about the dignity of duty in the armed forces, it was framed by Cacavas and Osgood's martial music and stirring choral refrains.  In 1967 it peaked at number 16 on the Billboard 200 record chart.

Other work
Stationed adjacent to Arlington National Cemetery at Fort Myer during his service with the U.S. Army Band, using pseudonyms Osgood worked as an announcer for radio stations in the Washington area to supplement his income and experience.  He hosted the morning show on WEAM (WZHF today) as "Charlie Woods."  At WGMS, he called himself "Carl Walden."  At WPGC (AM) (WJFK (AM) today), a rock station, he referred to himself as "Chuck Forest."

In September 1955, President Dwight D. Eisenhower suffered a serious heart attack during a vacation in Denver, Colorado, and was confined to a hospital room there until November. During this time, under the auspices of WGMS Osgood hosted a closed-circuit program of classical music delivered exclusively to the president's room to encourage his relaxation and convalescence.

WGMS Radio

When his tour with the U.S. Army Band was completed, in October 1957 Osgood returned to WGMS full-time as announcer Charles Wood and as a special assistant to the general manager.  Before the end of 1958, WGMS promoted him to program director.

In 1960, credited by name and as a WGMS announcer, he provided introductions and commentary on a six-record album of a collection of thirty-three speeches by President Franklin Delano Roosevelt titled FDR Speaks.  Edited by historian Henry Steele Commager, it included a welcome by the president's widow, former first lady Eleanor Roosevelt.  Their son Franklin Delano Roosevelt, Jr. recited one of his father's speeches.  The Billboard magazine reported that FDR Speaks "was one of the most listened-to-attractions" at the 1960 Democratic National Convention which nominated senators John F. Kennedy and Lyndon B. Johnson as its candidates for President and Vice President of the United States.

WHCT Television

In April 1962, the parent company of WGMS, RKO General, transferred Osgood to Hartford, Connecticut and promoted him to his first job in television:  the general manager of Channel 18, WHCT (WUVN today).

WHCT was the first TV station in the United States to be licensed to use Phonevision, a system developed by Zenith that scrambled the station's picture and sound. This limited viewing to paid subscribers who were issued decoders attached to their television sets and telephone lines. The station offered its subscribers premium programming such as first-run movies, live sporting events, and cultural programs like ballets and symphonies, all with no commercials.  Although RKO expected to operate WHCT at a loss for the three years before the Federal Communications Commission was due to renew the station's license, by early 1963 the financial realities became too difficult to bear unabated.  In a 1985 interview with Broadcasting magazine, Osgood explained:

[The station] lost money at an alarming rate... [RKO] left me off the hook very gently. They said, "you’re fired."

ABC
Unemployed at age 30, Osgood turned to one of his Fordham classmates, Frank McGuire, who directed program development at ABC in New York. In 1963, McGuire hired Osgood to be one of the writers and hosts of Flair Reports which related human interest stories on the ABC Radio Network.

"I went from being the world's youngest station manager to being the world's oldest cub reporter", he quipped in a 1981 interview with People magazine.

Another new McGuire hire for Flair Reports whom Osgood befriended at ABC was Ted Koppel.

Becoming "Charles Osgood"
He began using the name "Charles Osgood" at ABC because the network already had an announcer named "Charles Woods." In a 2005 interview with Inside Radio, Osgood related the story:

They didn't want to have a Charles Woods and a Charles Wood.  When they told me to pick a name, I used my middle name as my last name.  It's worked out well and is a little more distinctive and professional.

Later career at CBS
Osgood moved over to CBS Radio in 1967 when it became clear, in his words, that he "wasn't going anywhere" at ABC.  He ended up working in both radio and television at CBS.

Radio 
Osgood worked as a reporter and anchor for WCBS.  In August 1967, he anchored the first morning drive shift for WCBS after its conversion to an all-news format. The first day of all-news programming aired on WCBS-FM after an airplane crashed into the AM station's antenna tower on New York's High Island, keeping WCBS off air until a temporary tower could be erected.

Osgood was host of Westwood One's The Osgood File, heard four times each weekday morning drive time on radio stations nationwide. Each three-minute Osgood File focused on a single story, ranging from a breaking development of national importance to a whimsical human-interest vignette. Some of those he did in rhyme, which is why he was known as CBS's "Poet in Residence."  He continued these broadcasts until December 29, 2017.

Television 
On television, Osgood joined CBS news in 1971.  He was a reporter, and served as anchor of the CBS Sunday Night News from 1981 to 1987, co-anchor of the weekday CBS Morning News and frequent news reader on CBS This Morning from 1987 to 1992, as well as occasional anchor of the CBS Afternoon News and the CBS Evening News with Dan Rather. In one of his best known roles, he hosted CBS News Sunday Morning from April 10, 1994 to September 25, 2016, succeeding the original host Charles Kuralt. Osgood's tenure of twenty-two years as host exceeded Kuralt's fifteen years.

Among his personal trademarks were his bow-tie, his weekly TV signoff "Until then, I'll see you on the radio", and his propensity for delivering his commentaries in whimsical verse. Example: When the Census Bureau invented a designation for cohabitant(s) as "Person(s) of Opposite Sex Sharing Living Quarters", or "POSSLQ", Osgood turned it into a pronounceable three-syllable word and composed a prospective love poem that included these lines, which he later used as the title of one of his books:
"There's nothing that I wouldn't do
If you would be my POSSLQ."

Osgood regularly pronounced the 21st-century years 2001, 2002, etc., as "twenty oh one, twenty oh two..." as opposed to the more common "two thousand one, two thousand two", etc.

End of broadcasting career 
On December 21, 2017, it was announced that Osgood would retire from the radio show due to health concerns ending his broadcast career. His final broadcasts were on December 29, 2017.

Other works
In 1956, Osgood wrote a three-act play called A Single Voice.

He was voice of the narrator in the 2008 animated film Horton Hears a Who!.

He wrote a biweekly syndicated newspaper column. He is the author of six books: Nothing Could Be Finer Than a Crisis That Is Minor in the Morning (Holt, Rinehart & Winston, 1979); There's Nothing That I Wouldn't Do If You Would Be My POSSLQ (Holt, Rinehart & Winston, 1981); Osgood on Speaking: How to Think on Your Feet Without Falling on Your Face (William Morrow and Company, 1988); The Osgood Files (G.P. Putnam's Sons, 1991); See You on the Radio (G.P. Putnam's Sons, 1999); and the most recent, Defending Baltimore Against Enemy Attack (Hyperion, 2004).

Personal life
Osgood raised his family in Englewood, New Jersey. He and his wife, Jeanne Crafton, have five children.

When they became empty nesters, Osgood and his wife moved to a 12-room duplex on West 57th Street at 7th Avenue in New York City.

A road in Altoona, Pennsylvania, Osgood Drive, that's mostly used for the Logantown Centre, is named after Charles Osgood.

Honors
 1990: National Association of Broadcasters Hall of Fame, radio division
 2004: Walter Cronkite Award for Excellence in Journalism.
 2005: Paul White Award, Radio Television Digital News Association

See also
 New Yorkers in journalism

References

External links
 
 Official CBS biography
 The Osgood File 
 
 

1933 births
Living people
American television news anchors
American television reporters and correspondents
American radio journalists
CBS News people
Military personnel from New York City
Fordham University alumni
People from Englewood, New Jersey
People from Manhattan
St. Cecilia High School (New Jersey) alumni
20th-century American journalists
American male journalists
21st-century American journalists
Journalists from New York City
60 Minutes correspondents
WFUV people